Judith McHale (December 8, 1942 – August 23, 1995) was a Canadian Olympic swimmer. She was born in London, Ontario, and was the daughter of James and Nora McHale. She qualified to compete in the butterfly and breaststroke swimming events for team Canada at the 1960 Olympics in Rome. She placed 24th in the 200m breaststroke and eighth in the medley relay.

In 1965, McHale married Richard Dale Birk. The couple had three children. She died from complications related to breast cancer on August 23, 1995.

See also
 Swimming at the 1960 Summer Olympics

References

External links
 
 
 
 
 

1942 births
1995 deaths
Olympic swimmers of Canada
Canadian female swimmers
Canadian female butterfly swimmers
Canadian female breaststroke swimmers
Swimmers from London, Ontario
Swimmers at the 1960 Summer Olympics